Phrosinidae is a family of amphipods belonging to the order Amphipoda.

Genera:
 Anchylomera Milne Edwards, 1830
 Euprimnus Fraser, 1961
 Hieraconyx Guérin, 1838
 Phrosina Risso, 1822
 Primno Guérin-Méneville, 1836

References

Amphipoda